is a former Japanese football player.

Playing career
Miyazawa was born in Narashino on September 15, 1976. After graduating from Meiji University, he joined J1 League club Urawa Reds in 1999. Although he played several matches as forward and offensive midfielder, he could not play many matches. In 2002, he moved to J2 League club Albirex Niigata. He became a regular player as defensive midfielder and offensive midfielder. The club won the champions in 2003 and was promoted to J1 from 2004. However his opportunity to play decreased. In July 2004, he moved to J2 club Montedio Yamagata on loan. He became a regular player as left midfielder. In 2005, he returned to Albirex Niigata. However he could hardly play in the match. In September 2006, he moved to Montedio Yamagata again. He became a regular player as left midfielder again and played many matches for a long time. The club was also promoted to J1 from 2009. In 2011, the club finished at the bottom place and was relegated J2 from 2012. His opportunity to play also decreased in 2012 and he retired end of 2012 season.

Club statistics

References

External links

1976 births
Living people
People from Narashino
Meiji University alumni
Association football people from Chiba Prefecture
Japanese footballers
J1 League players
J2 League players
Urawa Red Diamonds players
Albirex Niigata players
Montedio Yamagata players
Association football midfielders